Pavel Botev (born 19 October 1963) is a Bulgarian judoka. He competed in the men's extra-lightweight event at the 1988 Summer Olympics.

References

1963 births
Living people
Bulgarian male judoka
Olympic judoka of Bulgaria
Judoka at the 1988 Summer Olympics
Sportspeople from Sofia
Universiade bronze medalists for Bulgaria
Universiade medalists in judo
Medalists at the 1985 Summer Universiade